Cryptolechia murcidella is a moth in the family Depressariidae. It was described by Hugo Theodor Christoph in 1877. It is found in Iran.

References

Moths described in 1877
Cryptolechia (moth)